The Hits is a Hot adult contemporary music radio network, broadcasting to 26 markets across New Zealand. It was set up by Government broadcaster Radio New Zealand in 1993 by consolidating existing stations into a single brand and has been privately owned since 1996. The Hits has had the broadest broadcast reach of any radio network in the country since 1996, and is now available on 40 full-power FM frequencies and 18 iHeartRadio streams.

Most of the individual stations started out as local AM stations owned by state broadcaster Radio New Zealand. Many have given a platform to broadcasting names like Selwyn Toogood, Paul Holmes, Peter Sinclair, Jenny-May Clarkson (nee Coffin) and Jason Gunn. John "Boggy" McDowell was an announcer on the Southland station for 33 years. Despite a major reduction in local programmes since 1993, most stations still have a local three-hour breakfast programme or a six-hour daytime programme.

An estimated 282,000 people listen to The Hits every week, including 85,000 people in Auckland region. The network targets 25- to 54-year-old homeowners, socially-active parents and price-conscious household shoppers. In April 2014, the network re-branded from Classic Hits to The Hits to attract more younger listeners. Later that year, it came under the ownership of New Zealand Media and Entertainment.

History

Early years
The Hits was originally known as Classic Hits up until April 2014. Classic Hits unofficially began in Auckland in 1987 when 1ZM (also known as 1251ZM at the time) changed music format to play "classic hits" music and branding was changed to Classic Hits Twelve Fifty One. In 1989 Auckland's Classic Hits moved to FM, becoming Classic Hits 97FM. The ZM station that exists in Auckland today is a new station created in 1997 to replace Magic 91FM.

Other stations in the Classic Hits group began as local commercial stations owned by the Government-owned Radio New Zealand, at a time when the New Zealand Government had a monopoly on the New Zealand radio market. In some regions, the station that would eventually become The Hits, was the only available radio station in that region. By the early 1990s, Radio New Zealand had switched most of their stations to FM but retained the stations original AM frequency for coverage in areas where the FM frequency could not be reached or for listeners with an AM only radio. The AM frequency was utilized for talkback and specialist shows in addition to the regular programming on the FM frequency. To cut costs and prepare the stations for commercial sale, Radio New Zealand began rebranding AM stations to Newstalk ZB and rebranding the FM stations as Classic Hits. The Classic Hits stations originally retained their heritage identity until 2009, and used a uniform green diamond logo until June 2011.

The first group of the stations adopted the brand in late 1993 or early 1994. Waikato's 1ZH became Classic Hits ZHFM, Bay of Plenty's 1ZD Radio BOP became Classic Hits BOP FM, Rotorua's Geyserland FM became Classic Hits Geyserland FM, Radio Taranaki became Classic Hits Taranaki FM, and Hawke's Bay's Bay City Radio became Classic Hits Bay City Radio. Similar names were adopted by Radio Northland, Radio Nelson, South Canterbury's Radio Caroline, Dunedin's 4ZB and Southland's 4ZA.. Wellington Goldtime Oldies B90FM and Christchurch's Goldtime Oldies B98FM also rebranded as Classic Hits but retained the stations oldies format playing music from the 1960s and 1970s, all other Classic Hits stations at the time were playing music from the 1960s to current 1990s hits. Programming remained local on all stations between 6am and 7pm with a networked night show originally based in Hamilton and with Hamilton advertising, at this stage Auckland, Wellington and Christchurch were still local 24 hours a day. In 1995 the night show was moved to Auckland.

Privatisation

In July 1996 the New Zealand Government sold off the commercial arm of Radio New Zealand, which included, among other things, the Classic Hits brand. The new owner was The Radio Network, a subsidiary of APN News & Media and Clear Channel Communications, which operated as a division of the Australian Radio Network. The company expanded its reach with new purchases, converting most of its local stations to the Classic Hits brand.

The new business controlled 60% of the radio advertising market in November 1998 and more than half the market in 2002. However, in response to increased competition and falling market share, it looked for ways to cut costs. In its early years Classic Hits broadcast live local programmes in every region from Monday to Saturday, taking Auckland network programmes at night and on Sundays. In 1998 it reduced local programming to four hours a day in all regions except Christchurch, and introduced new network shows for mornings and afternoons. As Christchurch announcers left, their shows were also replaced with network programmes.

Network programming

In 1998 local programming on almost all Classic Hits stations was reduced down to a 4-hour breakfast show between 6am and 10am. By using new satellite networking technology, Classic Hits stations were able to have local shows at breakfast time, and have network shows presented from the Classic Hits Auckland studios with local advertisements, weather forecasts and breakouts at other times of the day. The local stations remained commercially viable in otherwise unviable markets and the network was able to invest in its brand and programmes. The company was able to leverage its reach for national advertising clients, including agency campaigns. At this stage Classic Hits 98FM in Christchurch was exempt from these changes and continued to run local shows 24 hours a day. Local content was also retained in Auckland as network presenters began presenting separate voice breaks for local Auckland listeners.

Also in 1998 all of The Radio Network's remaining local stations formed the Community Radio Network. Each station retained its local brands and breakfast shows, but took network programmes from Lakeland FM in Taupo at other times of the day. South Canterbury's Radio Caroline left Classic Hits to join the new network. Other stations included Lakeland FM, Whanganui's River City Radio, Tokoroa's Radio Forestland, Radio Wairarapa, Marlborough's Radio Marlborough, the West Coast's Radio Scenicland and Ashburton's 3ZE. In 2001 the stations were rebranded as Classic Hits, giving Classic Hits the broadest reach of any station in the country. A new Southern Lakes station was introduced in Queenstown in 2005, and the Radio Waitomo station in Te Kuiti closed down.
In 2008, stations dropped heritage titles from their names. In 2009, a network breakfast show was introduced for King Country and for other markets when local hosts were away. In 2010, the King Country station was scrapped and local weekend breakfast shows were replaced with network shows. In late 2010, highlights of Christchurch and Wellington breakfast shows began to be broadcast during the weekend breakfast timeslot. Classic Hits Southland retained a local breakfast show with an unpaid announcer, and Dunedin produced a highlights show.

In 2012 local breakfast shows were cut back one hour, and the networked morning and afternoon shows were shortened to make way for a new drive show with Jason Gunn and Dave Fitzgerald from the Christchurch studio. The remaining local Saturday breakfast shows in Manawatu and Southland were also cut.

Relaunch as The Hits

On 4 April 2014 the National Business Review reported Polly Gillespie and Grant Kareama were planning to move from ZM to a new network breakfast show on Classic Hits. The newspaper's source claimed 20 local breakfast announcers would be made redundant. Polly and Grant had previously worked together on ZM originally to just a local Wellington audience from the 1980s and to a national audience from 2001.
On 15 April The Radio Network confirmed Classic Hits would become The Hits, and on 28 April the change took effect. The Classic Hits brand ended at midnight the previous evening, and The Hits brand was used from breakfast that morning. The first song played under the new format was Best Day of My Life by American Authors.

Polly Gillespie and Grant Kareama took over the network breakfast programme. Most stations discontinued their local breakfast shows in favour of the new show, moving breakfast announcers to a new daytime slot. Others kept their breakfast shows, and continued taking network morning and afternoon shows. Stations began taking a single network programme when hosts were away, and many local breakfast co-hosts took on other roles within the company or found other jobs. The network's parent company, The Radio Network, became part of New Zealand Media and Entertainment in October 2014. 
At the end of 2016 Fairfax Media reported an article to say Polly and Grant had been axed from their morning show in favour of an Auckland-based show presented by Sam Wallace and Toni Street. The article initially failed to mention the change only affected Auckland and that Polly and Grant would continue presenting their breakfast from Wellington to those markets already taking the Polly and Grant show. In February 2017 Polly and Grant were taken off the air after a dispute with their employer and in March 2017 their departure from The Hits was confirmed at the conclusion of their contract that same month. The recently launched Auckland breakfast show consisting of Sarah Gandy, Toni Street and Sam Wallace were confirmed to take over the network breakfast timeslot on March 26, 2017.
In February 2020 an announcement was made that Jono Pryor and Ben Boyce (Jono and Ben) would replace the current network breakfast with Toni Street and Sam Wallace moving to Coast. Jono and Ben previously hosted the drive show on The Edge and between 2012 and 2018 Jono and Ben had their own TV show self titled TV show Jono and Ben on TV3.

Music

Historic playlists
Classic Hits was named for its classic hits format, and the original Auckland station promoted itself as "The best of the 1960s, 1970s and the 1980s". When other stations started joining the network from 1993, they continued to create their own playlists. Regional stations retained a broad range of music, using the slogan "All the Hits from the 1960s to the 1990s". The Wellington and Christchurch stations played only music from the 1960s and 1970s, using the taglines "Good Time Oldies" and A Better Music Mix".

In 1996, regional stations dropped music from the 1960s and adopted the slogan "From the Nineties to the Seventies". In 1998, the Auckland and Wellington stations followed suit and a shared network playlist was rolled out. Classic Hits was the station of the "Hits of the 70s, 80s and 90s" from 1998, and the station of the "Hits of the 70s, 80s, 90s and Today" from 2000. The network dropped music from the 1970s in 2005, becoming the station of "80s, 90s and Whatever". It added more current hits in 2007, becoming the station of the "80s, 90s and now". It dropped more music from the 1980s in 2011, becoming the station of the "80s, 90s, today".

Current playlist

Since 2014, the network has had a hot adult contemporary playlist mostly from the 2000s and 2010s. It used the tagline "All the Hits, All the Time" in 2014, followed by "All Your Favourite Hits" in 2015 then "90's Till Now" from 2016. Many of its tracks are from top 40 stars, like Coldplay, Taylor Swift, Ed Sheeran, Sam Smith and Bruno Mars.

Today, The Hits is known as playing "All The Hits You Know And Love" with a broader playlist from the 80’s to today.

The network plays a range of New Zealand music, giving promotion and airtime to Brooke Fraser, Benny Tipene, Lorde, and Avalanche City. However, it has been criticised for giving most of its airtime to American music.

Programming

The Hits run a standard breakfast, daytime, drive and night schedule with breakfast running between 6:00am and 9:00am daytime programming between 9:00am and 3:00pm, drive show between 3:00pm and 7:00pm and a 7:00pm to midnight night show. The network broadcasts music, commentary and celebrity interviews. Some hosts have also carried out on-air stunts or recorded parody songs.

Breakfast

Jono Pryor and Ben Boyce host a live network breakfast broadcast from Auckland, this show is currently heard in across most stations. News, sport and weather sourced from the NZME newsroom is heard every 30 minutes, read out by Ash Thomas, and traffic reports is broadcast every 15 minutes. Former newsreaders include Alison Leonard (2004-2007), Melanie Homer (2007-2010) and Glen Stuart (2011-2014). Local breakfast shows can be heard in Hawkes Bay, Dunedin and Queenstown.

Weekdays

Since the rebrand to The Hits in 2014 most markets initially ran a local 6 hour daytime show between 9am and 3pm, in some cases the local show is spread across two markets, for example the same announcer presents a local show for Taupo and Rotorua. Local content has since been reduced across the network with some stations receiving only network content.

Between 9am and 3pm a network daytime show presented by Dave Nicholas can be heard in markets that have a local breakfast show as well as markets with no local shows. This show is presented from the Christchurch studios with the announcer producing a local voice break for Auckland also.

Prior to 2017 the network day shows were hosted by Sarah Gandy from the Auckland studios between 9am-12pm and Dave Fitzgerald from the Christchurch studios between 12pm and 3pm. Each of these presenters produced voicetracks for the network show as well as a local Auckland show with Dave Fitzgerald also providing local voicebreaks for Christchurch. Murray Lindsay hosted the daytime show for 16 years, from 1997 to 2012.

Other programmes

The Hits Drive Show is hosted by Brad and Laura . The show was previously hosted by Pat Courtenay (1998-1999), Andrew Dickens (1999-2000), Grant Bailey (2000-2003), Mark Bunting (2003-2007), Jason Reeves (2007–2010), Jason Gunn (2012-2013), Justin Brown (2014), Guy Parsons (2014) and Paul Flynn (2015-2019). The station's night show is hosted by Estelle Clifford since 2009 with local voice-breaks for Auckland listeners. Former hosts include Peter Sinclair (1993-1997), Andy Dye (1998-1999), Gael Ludlow (2001-2002), Dene Young (2003-2004), Dave Smart (2004-2007), Will Johnston (2007-2008), Heemi Katene-Hill (2008-2009) and Mike Plant (2009).

Saturday Morning Breakfast with Jono & Ben is a replay of their show and Sunday Morning is ? and weekend afternoons feature a rotation of announcers. Party Mix, a commercial-free, announcer-free party music show, plays on Saturdays and public holidays.

Broadcasting

Northland
The Hits is covered through the Northland region using four frequencies – 95.6FM in the Far North, 106.1FM in the Bay of Islands, 95.6FM in the Mid North and 95.6FM in Whangārei.

Originally known as Radio Northland and broadcasting on 1026 and 1215 AM with the call sign 1ZN, the station moved to 96FM in Whangārei during the late 1990s.

The station is located on Bank Street, Whangārei.

Local programming: Charmaine Soljak presents the local weekday show between 9am and 3pm.

Auckland 97.4FM
The Hits 97.4 is the flagship of the brand. The majority of the network announcers are based here.

The station is located at new NZME Radio headquarters in Graham Street in central Auckland. Since February 2017 The Hits has run a local breakfast show, initially presented by Sarah Gandy, Sam Wallace and Toni Street. Gandy left the show and was replaced by Laura McGoldrick, with the addition of The Hits’ content director Todd Campbell. From April this became a Network show presented across the North Island. Most shows outside of breakfast are presented from the Auckland studio to markets taking network shows, most announcers based in Auckland produce two voice breaks, a local voice break for Auckland mentioning Auckland frequency and region specific information for Auckland and a separate voice break for the rest of the country tailored to a national audience.

Local programming: Dave Nicholas presents the local day show between 9am to 3pm. Megan Papas presents the 3pm pick up between 3pm to 4pm Brad and Laura Driving you home between 4pm to 7pm Estelle Clifford presents the night show between 7pm and 12am weeknights.  Saturday Morning Breakfast with Jono & Ben is a replay of their show and Sunday Morning is ? & is followed by various announcers in the afternoons.

Waikato 98.6FM
Originally Waikato's 1ZH this station was first started in 1949 broadcasting on 1310 AM. The station moved to 1296 AM in 1978. On air names included 1300 1ZH and Hits and Memories 1ZH during the 1980s.

The station became 98.6 ZHFM on 25 May 1990 when the station switched to FM. The Classic Hits name was actually used on a bumper sticker as well as A Better Music Mix before the station was re branded as Classic Hits ZHFM in 1993. The 98.6 ZHFM frequency can also be heard in Tauranga, the outskirts of Auckland and in a number of places in Northland due to its high power and the high elevation of its transmission site.

Mark Bunting joined the station in 2000 as the breakfast host, and moved to Classic Hits Auckland to present the Drivetime show over the entire Classic Hits network between 2003 and 2006. He moved back to the Waikato breakfast show in 2007.

Mark Bunting continued presenting breakfast following the rebrand to The Hits but was later fired when it was announced he would be moving to opposition The Breeze in Waikato. and the networked breakfast was put in place of this show.

The station is located on Hardley Street in Hamilton Central.

Local programming: Blair Dowling presents the local day show between 9am to 3pm.

South Waikato 97.3FM
Originally known as 1ZO or Radio Forestland on 1413 am in the 1980s and 1990s, then 'Classic Hits Radio Forestland' before switching to FM in 2006. The station was part of the Classic Hits Community Radio Network.

The station used to have its own local breakfast show, but in 2012 this was replaced with the Waikato breakfast show hosted by Mark Bunting with local advertising. Following the rebrand to The Hits the station now has the same programming as Waikato

The station still has a local office located on Bridge Street in Tokoroa.

Local programming: Blair Dowling presents the local day show between 9am to 3pm.

Coromandel
The Hits Coromandel is the most recent station in the network which launched in December 2017. Prior to this, the station was called Sea FM and was an independently run station which merged with NZME in 2017. The station initially retained a local daytime show, however this ended in February 2018. The station broadcasts on the following frequencies across the Coromandel region, Thames 106FM, Paunui, Tairua, Whangamatā 100.3FM and Whitianga 106.9FM.

Bay of Plenty 95.0FM
Originally 1ZD Radio B.O.P. broadcasting on 1008 AM. The station moved to 95.0FM around 1990 becoming 95 B.O.P. FM. The station was rebranded as Classic Hits in 1993. The Hits 98.6FM Hamilton can also be heard in Tauranga.

The station is located on Harrington Street in Tauranga City.

Local programming: Lauren Mabbett presents the local weekday show between 9am and 3pm.

Will Johnston now hosts the local weekend show on Saturday's from 9am - 12pm.

Rotorua 97.5FM
Originally known as Radio Geyserland on 1350 AM. The station moved to FM in 1988 and became known as 97.5 Geyserland FM. When the station was rebranded as Classic Hits in 1993 the name Geyserland was no longer used on air, however it still appeared on the station's logo at the time of rebranding. The Hits in Rotorua also broadcasts on 90.8FM to the Reporoa, Broadlands, Ngakuru and Waikite Valley areas.

The station is located on Fenton Street in Rotorua City.

Local programming: Paul Hickey presents the local daytime show between 9am and 3pm.

Taupo 96.8FM
Originally known as Radio Lakeland, broadcasting on 1494 am in Taupo and 1386 am in Tūrangi. The station moved to 96.7FM in 1988 and was then known as Lakeland FM. For a short time a second frequency served Tūrangi on 89.6, and later 92.4 but was discontinued.

Lakeland FM was the host of the Community Radio Network, a network established between community radio stations then operated by The Radio Network. Outside of the breakfast show, all Community Radio Network stations received content from the Lakeland FM studio. In 2001 all the Community Radio Network stations joined up with Classic Hits, with all programming outside of breakfast now coming from Auckland. At this point Lakeland FM became known as Classic Hits Lakeland FM. The station still has a local office located on Paora Hapi Street in Taupō.

Following the rebrand to The Hits the local breakfast was dropped and now the station has the same local daytime show as Rotorua.

Local programming: Paul Hickey presents the local daytime show between 9am and 3pm (From The Hits Rotorua Studios).

Gisborne 90.9FM
Originally known as 2ZG on 1010 am, then 'The Coaster 2ZG' on 945 AM, before moving to 90.9FM, and later being rebranded as Classic Hits 90.9. As of 2018 the station does not feature locally produced programming.

The station is located on the corner of Grey Street and Childers Road in Gisborne.

Taranaki 90FM
The Hits in Taranaki originates from 2ZP Radio Taranaki, which broadcast on 1053 am in New Plymouth and 1557 am in Hawera (as 2ZH). Around 1992, the station began simulcasting on 90.0FM which was previously occupied by its sister station 'Q90FM'. It was then known as '90FM Radio Taranaki' before becoming Classic Hits 90FM in 1993.

Previous breakfast host for 15 years, Barney (Brent Procter) retired from broadcasting as of 20 December 2013.

The station is located in Broadcasting House on the corner of Powderham and Brougham Streets in New Plymouth Central. Taranaki originally had a local breakfast show between 6am and 9am presented by Adam Green and Eryn Deverson. From 2017 the Breakfast became networked from Auckland however local broadcasting remained with a new local workday show

Local programming: Richard presents a local 9am to 3pm show for Taranaki on 90.0FM and South Taranaki on 91.2FM.

Hawke's Bay 89.5FM
Originally known as 2ZC or Bay City Radio broadcasting on 1280AM, later 1278 am, since 1 October 1957, the station moved to 89.5FM in 1994 and it became 'Classic Hits 89FM - Bay City Radio'. In 2002, the station's name was altered to 'Classic Hits 89.5 - Bay City Radio'. From 1 January 2011, the station began a relay station in Wairoa on 99.7FM.

This station broadcasts from the famous Broadcasting House building on the corner of Dickens & Dalton Streets in Napier – one of only two central city building's left standing following the 1931 Napier earthquake. Hawkes Bay maintained a local breakfast show as it transitioned into The Hits originally presented by Martin Good and Sarah Van Der Kley. Martin Good departed the station at the end of 2016 and Sarah Van Der Kley left to join Martin on another radio venture in September 2018. From 9am all programming is networked.

Local programming: Breakfast with Adam Green and Megan Banks between 6am-9am.

Whanganui 89.6FM
Originally known as 2XA this station began broadcasting in Whanganui in October 1949 on 1200AM. The station was later renamed to 2ZW and moved to 1197 am in 1978. The station was renamed to River City Radio in 1988 and 89.6 River City FM in 1993 after the station began broadcasting on 89.6FM. In 2001 the station became Classic Hits River City FM after joining the Classic Hits network.

The station is located on the corner of Guyton and Campbell Streets, Whanganui. As of 2018, there are no local shows with all content networked from Auckland.

Manawatu 97.8FM
Originally known as 2ZA and broadcasting on 940AM, later 927AM, the station began simulcasting on 97.8FM in the early 1990s under the name 'AM-FM 2ZA'. Soon after the station was relaunched as 'The New 98FM'. 98FM eventually joined the Classic Hits network, but due to the 'Classic Hits' name already being used by an opposition station within the same market, 98FM was forced to adopt the name 'Greatest Hits 98FM'. Presumably, as a result of an agreement or settlement between the two companies, the opposition station dropped the 'Classic Hits' slogan and 98FM became 'Classic Hits 97.8'. Later, after more than 5 years of not using it, part of the 2ZA call sign was returned when the station became Classic Hits 97.8 ZAFM. Eventually all local programming was removed and today the station is fully networked.

The station is located on Main Street in Palmerston North.

Kapiti Coast-Horowhenua 92.7FM
Originally Classic Hits broadcast on 89.4FM as a relay of Classic Hits 90FM in Wellington, this station broadcast on 89.4 as far back as 1991 when the station was 2ZB and later B90FM. In 2001 this relay was dropped and replaced with Newstalk ZB. Classic Hits made a return to the Kapiti area in 2004 on 92.7FM a frequency previously used by Sports Roundup/Radio Sport. Programming on the new station was separate to Classic Hits 90FM in Wellington with the station presenting its own local breakfast. However, in 2009 this local breakfast show was dropped and replaced with Wellington's Classic Hits breakfast show. Following the rebrand to The Hits the Kapiti station takes the same local shows as Wellington.

Despite no local shows, the station still has a local office on Kapiti Road, Paraparaumu.

Wairarapa 90.3FM
Originally known as 2XB this station was first started in March 1958 broadcasting on 840AM. The stations call sign was changed to 2ZD in 1968 and in 1978 the station moved to 846AM. The station was known on air during the 1980s and 1990s as Radio Wairarapa before becoming 90.1 Wairarapa FM in 1999, when the station began broadcasting on 90.1FM. In 2001 the station was rebranded as Classic Hits Wairarapa. The broadcast frequency was changed to 90.3FM in October 2010.

From 2013 the station no longer has any local show - following the rebrand as The Hits all shows are networked.

Despite no local shows, the station still has a local office on Church Street, Masterton.

Wellington 90.1FM
Originally an FM repeater for Wellington's 2ZB (89.8FM) in the early 1990s, the station was then relaunched as 'Goodtime Oldies B90FM' which also broadcast to the Kapiti Coast on 89.4. The station ran a 60s and 70s music format which originated from the Wellington studio and took no network programming. Around 1996, B90FM became 'Classic Hits 90FM' and an adjustment was made to the station's frequency, shifting from 89.8 to 90.0FM. Unlike the rest of the Classic Hits network, 90FM ran with a "60s, 70s and 80s" format, whereas all other Classic Hits stations (with the exception of Auckland and Christchurch) were playing "70s, 80s and 90s". Programming continued to originate from Wellington until 1998 when local shows succumbed to network programming. The Kapiti Coast repeater was eventually dropped and replaced with Newstalk ZB. On 27 October 2010, the station shifted frequencies to 90.1FM, to comply with Government broadcasting regulations.

The station is located on the Corner of Taranaki and Abel Smith Streets, in Central Wellington.

Local programming: Bel Crawford presents the day show between 9am and 3pm.

Nelson 89.6FM
Originally an FM simulcast of 'Radio Nelson' (also on 1341 am), this station later became part of the Classic Hits family and was known as Classic Hits 90FM. The station broadcast to Nelson City on 89.8 and to the wider area (including Motueka and Tākaka) on 90.4. There is also a relay in Golden Bay on 1269 AM. More recently, 90FM was known as 'Classic Hits 89.8 and 90.4' but this name was dropped in late 2006 after the 90.4 frequency was shifted to 89.8 (in synchronous transmission with the Nelson City outlet). This left Nelson launching Radio Hauraki on 90.6FM in early 2007. **A national realigning of frequencies created another slight shift in frequencies with 'Classic Hits' moving to 89.6FM, and 'Hauraki' to 90.4FM, where they broadcast today.

The Classic Breakfast was hosted by Kent Robertson until his last show, on Friday 12 October 2012.

Today, now known as 'The Hits 89-6', the station remains located on Selwyn Place in Nelson City, Scott Radovanovich presented a local breakfast show across Nelson and Marlborough until it was replaced with the Auckland-based breakfast show towards the end of 2018. Today, Hayden Rose presents the 9am-3pm weekday show.

Marlborough 96.9FM
Originally branded as Radio Marlborough, this station was first launched in 1965 as 2ZE broadcasting on 1540AM. The station moved to 1539 am in 1978 and then became Radio Marlborough. A relay to Picton was also established in 1981, also on 1539 am, but in 1993 moved to 1584 am. Radio Marlborough began broadcasting on 96.9FM in 1991. The station became Classic Hits Radio Marlborough in 2001 and at the same time the AM frequency was used to launch Radio Sport in the Marlborough region.

The station is located in Cavalier House on Market Street, Blenheim. The main transmitter is located in the Wither Hills, 4 km south-southwest of Blenheim, with a second transmitter broadcasting on 89.1FM in the Picton area.

During its time as The Hits the station had a local day show which then became a breakfast show. Scott Radovanovich presented the local breakfast show across Marlborough as well as Nelson until it was replaced with the Auckland-based breakfast show towards the end of 2018. No local programming originates from the Blenheim studios.

West Coast
Formerly known as Radio Scenicland, launched in 1968 on 747 AM in Greymouth (callsign 3ZA), 1287 AM in Westport (callsign 3ZW) and 1521 AM in Reefton (callsign 3ZR), this station was part of the Community Radio Network. The station later became known as Scenicland FM after moving to the FM band in November 1992, then joined the Classic Hits network around 2001. Today the station can be heard on 90.9FM in Westport, 97.5FM in Reefton, 90.7 & 93.1FM in Greymouth, 97.1FM in Hokitika and 90.5FM in South Westland.

Christchurch 97.7FM
Originally known as "B98FM - The Best Music Mix" in the early 1990s, this station was rebranded as 'Goodtime Oldies B98FM' several years later, taking on an oldies music format. By the mid 1990s, the name was altered to 'Classic Hits B98FM', then again to 'Classic Hits 98FM' and finally 'Classic Hits 97.7'. This was the only Classic Hits station to not have its local programming reduced to 4 hours in 1998. It remained live and local 24 hours a day until 2002, operating independently from the rest of the Classic Hits network. In 2003 the station began reducing local content to air during the daytime only, and as announcers left the station, reduced even further. From 2006 the only local content was the breakfast show, as with other Classic Hits stations at the time. The station was located on Worcester Street, Central Christchurch in the former TVNZ studio building. However, due to the devastating earthquake on 22 February 2011, the studio moved temporarily to Riccarton Road, Christchurch. The station is now located on a new purpose-built facility on Midas Place, Middleton, Christchurch.

Until Friday 20 July 2012, the local breakfast show was hosted by Jason Gunn and Dave Fitzgerald. From 23 July 2012 Jason and Dave moved to broadcasting a nationwide Drive show between 4 pm and 7 pm broadcast from the Classic Hits Christchurch studios to all of New Zealand. Jason and Dave also pre-recorded a show for the nationwide network to air on Saturday mornings, featuring the best bits from their show each week, but this was later axed in November 2013. At the end of 2013 Jason left Classic Hits and in 2014 a new afternoon show was started presented by Dave Fitzgerald and Guy Parsons still from Christchurch.

Prior to the rebranding to The Hits the local breakfast show was hosted by AJ Funnell, Chloe Emirali and Andy Ellis. With the changeover to The Hits, AJ Funnell was moved to present a local show between 9am and 12pm and Dave Fitzgerald presented a network show from Christchurch but at the same time separate voice breaks are recorded for local Christchurch and Auckland audiences. A local breakfast was reinstated in 2017 presented by Dave Fitzgeral and Brodie Kemp, this show was networked to Ashburton and Timaru. The local breakfast was axed in March 2020 
From 29 May 2017, the station began a relay station in Kaikoura on 91.5FM.

Local programming: Dave Nicholas presents a local 9am to 3pm show for Christchurch, while producing a network show.

Ashburton 89.3FM
Originally known as 3ZE on 873 AM, this station was part of the Classic Hits Community Radio Network. The station began broadcasting on 92.5FM in 2001 and became known as Classic Hits 92.5 ZEFM. Additional frequencies on 89.3FM and 96.5FM were later added.

When the station was rebranded The Hits, previous breakfast announcer Phil Hooper was shifted to the 9am–3pm slot. However, due to listener dissatisfaction with the changes, The Hits' parent company, The Radio Network, opted to launch the Gore based Hokonui brand into Ashburton on the 92.5FM frequency. At the same time The Hits local announcer Phil Hooper was moved to Hokonui to present a local breakfast for an Ashburton audience with all other programming on Hokonui originating from Southland or Dunedin. The Hits continued to broadcast in Ashburton on 89.3FM but now with complete network programming. The Hits 96.5FM frequency was also reassigned to Radio Hauraki in 2014.

Between 2017 and 2020 The Hits Ashburton received its breakfast show from the Christchurch station, today Ashburton takes the networked breakfast. Despite having no local shows, the station still has an office in Somerset House, Ashburton.

South Canterbury 94.7FM/98.7FM
Originally Radio Caroline broadcasting on 1160AM with the call sign 3XC from January 1949. In 1978 the station moved to 1152AM and changed call sign to 3ZC.

The station joined the Classic Hits network in 1995, originally as Classic Hits 99FM. In 1998 the station was dropped from the Classic Hits network and became part of the Community Radio Network as South Canterbury's 99FM. At this stage programming was reduced to a local breakfast show, and outside this time all programming came from the Community Radio Network studio in Taupo. In 2001 all Community Radio Network stations became part of Classic Hits, and as a result the station rejoined the Classic Hits network as Classic Hits 98.7. At the same time the 1152 AM frequency was reassigned to Newstalk ZB.

In 2005 the station began broadcasting on 94.7FM as well as the existing 98.7FM frequency; as a result the station became known as Classic Hits 98.7 and 94.7. The station is located on North Street in Timaru. The former Sophia Street studios were demolished to make way for car parking.

Following the rebrand to The Hits the former breakfast announcer Sam Wilson was moved to present the 9am - 3pm show. Later in 2014 The Hits Waitaki announcer Josh McIntyre took over this show broadcasting the same show to both Timaru and Oamaru listeners. Josh McIntyre presented a local breakfast show for South Canterbury until 2018. This show was replaced from 2019 with the Christchurch-based breakfast show and in 2020 the network breakfast show.

Oamaru 98.4FM
Originally known as 'Radio Waitaki' on 1395 am, then as 'Classic Hits 98.4 Waitaki FM' after they converted to FM. The 'Waitaki' name was later dropped from most station identification and the station was then known as 'Waitaki's Classic Hits 98.4'.

Following the rebrand to The Hits the breakfast announcer Josh McIntyre was moved to present the local 9 am – 3 pm show but later in 2014 Josh was moved to The Hits Timaru in the same time slot presenting the same show to both Timaru and Oamaru listeners.

From 2017 The Hits Oamaru receives its breakfast show from the Dunedin station.

Dunedin 89.4FM
Originally known as 4ZB on 1044AM, then ZBFM on 89.4FM when the station switched to FM in 1990. ZBFM joined the Classic Hits network in 1993 under the name 'Classic Hits 89FM' which was later changed to 'Classic Hits 89.4'.

The station is located on George Street.

Local programming: Breakfast with Callum Procter  and Patrina Roche between 6am and 9am. This is followed by a local 9am 3pm show with Tracy Chambers.

Southern Lakes
Launched in 2005 as Classic Hits Southern Lakes. The station covers Queenstown on 90.4FM, Wānaka on 96.2FM and Alexandra on 99.9FM.

The station is based on Earl Street, Queenstown.

Local programming: Craig 'Ferg' Ferguson present a local breakfast show between 6am and 9am followed by networking programming for the remainder of the day.

Southland 98.8FM
This station was originally Southland's 4ZA on 864AM. After converting to FM in the early 1990s, the station was known as 'Southland's 4ZA 98.8FM' for some time before joining the Classic Hits network as 'Classic Hits ZAFM'. The station also broadcasts in Te Anau on 90.4FM.

Historically the breakfast show was hosted by John "Boggy" McDowell. Boggy started on the 4ZA breakfast show on 1 June 1979 and remained presenting this show until 21 December 2012. Local news and sport was read by Malcolm Gayfer until the end of 2012. A local news service is no longer available. Malcolm Gayfer was with the station for 25 years and for a time was Boggy's co-host. More recently the breakfast show was presented by James McRobbie and Liv McBride, James left in early 2018 with his short lived replacement being Bradley Craig (BC). Following the departure of BC and with Liv going on maternity leave a decision was made to network Dunedin's breakfast show presented by Callum and P into Southland. In April 2020 the network breakfast from Dunedin was replaced with the national network breakfast show.

Despite no local show the station is located on the corner of Don and Deveron Streets, Invercargill with the studios used to broadcast the Marcus Lush night show on Newstalk ZB and some programming for Hokonui.

Other services

Events and promotions

The Hits runs a range of promotions, from activities at shops and gyms to giveaways of cars and travel. It is the official radio network of the Silver Ferns netball squad, the Fast5 Netball World Series and local community netball tournaments. In 2014 and 2015, it was the official network of the ANZ Championship Northern Mystics, Waikato Bay of Plenty Magic, Central Pulse, Canterbury Tactix and Southern Steel teams. Ticket giveaways and player interviews are broadcast on-air.

Classic Hits has sponsored touring artists, local events and national music tours. Between 2012 and 2014, for example, it secured naming rights to the Acoustic Church Tour and Winery Tour events featuring artists like Anika Moa, Boh Runga, Hollie Smith, Gin Wigmore, The Exponents, Stan Walker and Breaks Co-Op. Local stations have been involved in marathons, airshows, street races, and Christmas celebrations. They have also sponsored velodromes, driving ranges and public health campaigns.

Some stations in The Hits network support local branches of the Royal New Zealand Society for the Prevention of Cruelty to Animals. In 2015 the network hosted a live video feed of kittens from Auckland SPCA, as part of a nationwide campaign to promote cat adoption. It was accompanied by cat adoption drives at local SPCAs.

News and information

The Hits broadcasts its own news and sport bulletins on weekdays drawing from NZME resources, and broadcasts bulletins from Newstalk ZB on weekends. The stations feature regular traffic information, including TimeSaver Traffic updates in Auckland, Hamilton, Tauranga, Hawke’s Bay, Wellington, Christchurch and Dunedin. Community notices and cancellations are also broadcast on a daily basis.

Local hosts often editorialise about local events, politicians and organisations. Some hosts been elected to local councils or have been the focus for political campaigns. Some have also been the subject of on-air abuse by hosts on rival stations, being described as "fuckwits" or a "catty bitch".

The network is one of New Zealand's five nationwide civil defence broadcasters. Some local stations have performed this role during emergencies, and others have committed to do so if emergencies occur. The Christchurch station provided updates during the 2010 Canterbury earthquake, and continued broadcasting from a temporary studio in a motel room when its studio was damaged in the 2011 Christchurch earthquake.

Website and social media

The Hits website claims to reach 16,000 unique visitors a day, and 43,000 unique visitors and 164,000 page impressions a week. It targets women 35-44 with families, who are buyers of furniture, appliances, cars and holidays. The website was launched in 2005, and redesigned in 2007, 2011 and 2014. It currently features sections on recipes, parenting issues, videos, events, galleries, competitions and breaking news. The network has Twitter and Facebook pages, and each station has a Facebook page.

References